Mobile donating refers to donating (to an organization) using a mobile device.  Mobile donating is primarily done through an SMS or a phone call.

Mobile donating process 
Premium SMS donations: Text messaging, or SMS, is the primary means of mobile donating. Mobile phone users can make donations by texting a keyword to a specific SMS short code. Keywords are determined by the fundraising organization, and usually pertain to the organization's cause or purpose. Donation amounts are predetermined, commonly at $5 or $10, and users often have a limit of how many micro-donations they can send via sms to a single campaign in one month. After donating, users receive a confirmation text message and the donation amount is added to their monthly phone bill. Donations can take up to 90 days to be processed.

WAP donations: Mobile donating can also occur through a mobile WAP website. Cell phone users can access WAP donation pages by sending a specific text message to a designated keyword and receiving a link to the page in response, or by navigating to the page from a referring site. Upon reaching the WAP donation page, users are prompted to enter their cell phone numbers. Donations are confirmed with a text message sent to the donor's mobile phone, and the donation is added to the donor's monthly phone bill.

Mobile fundraising campaigns 

In the 2008 Text 2HELP campaign, the American Red Cross, in collaboration with the Wireless Foundation, has raised over US$190,000 through 38,091 text messages to provide relief for victims of natural disasters like Hurricane Gustav and Hurricane Ike. In South Africa, Nelson Mandela’s charity raised $85,000 USD in July 2008 with the cooperation of Zain, a South African mobile operator, using Mandela’s 90th birthday as the ‘call to give’; well-wishers from around the world could text in a birthday wish and make a donation at the same time.

The hitherto most successful mobile donating campaign has been organized in support of the relief efforts for the 2010 Haiti earthquake. The American Red Cross has raised over $32 million within one month after the disaster, and has demonstrated the unprecedented potential for small text-message donations.

Drawbacks to mobile giving 

Mobile giving can be a convenient way to donate to charity, but charity watchdog group the American Institute of Philanthropy has warned that there are some pitfalls to cell phone giving, including concerns that service providers may charge fees or take a cut of the donations.  AIP also warns that it can take as long as 120 days for a charity to actually receive a text donation and that wireless carriers may limit the number of times per month a user can donate via text. The watchdog group cautions, “A charity will generally receive your donation faster if you mail a check or donate directly to the charity online using its secure web site."

Scammers may also take advantage of natural disasters by posing as legitimate charities.

References

Telecommunication services
Donation